The Cayenne stubfoot toad (Atelopus flavescens), known in French as atélope jaunâtre, is a species of toad in the family Bufonidae found in northeastern French Guiana and in the adjacent Brazilian state Amapá. Its natural habitats are lowland primary forest where it is known from near fast-flowing, small streams. It is locally common. There are no major threats at present.

References 

Atelopus
Amphibians of Brazil
Amphibians of French Guiana
Amphibians described in 1841
Taxa named by André Marie Constant Duméril
Taxa named by Gabriel Bibron
Taxonomy articles created by Polbot